Kimberly Farrah Singh is a Trinidadian beauty pageant titleholder. She represented Trinidad and Tobago in Miss World 2015 in  Sanya, China on December 19, 2015.

Personal life
Kimberly Farrah Singh hails from the country side of Trinidad, in the town of Tabaquite. In 2012, after doing an internship at the Attorney General’s office she is currently studying Paralegal Studies an aspires to become an Attorney at Law.  Farrah- Singh states that she is a strong believer of fairness and equality. She said her vocation would enable her  to be an advocate for justice to the unheard and silenced individuals in society. Kimberly enjoys cooking meals such as, but not limited to curry: chicken, duck and goat, roti and pelau, just to name a few. From the age of three (3) she has been singing, it's something she truly loves doing. Kimberly is the leader of her church’s choir. She said it brings joy to her  heart and it has the power and ability to change the mood of the listening audience. From a very early age, Kimberly has been involved in many charity prior her victory as Miss Trinidad and Tobago 2015. 
Kimberly Farrah Singh, is passionate about helping children who are at a disadvantage in any way, is firm believer that they hold the keys to the future.  Farrah-Singh states that her  goal is to help these children tap into their beautiful purpose through empowerment sessions; letting them know that they can do anything they put their hearts and minds to, by targeting their self-esteem so that their self-image would act as a catalyst to ensure these dreams of theirs are fulfilled. It is her desire to make a difference in as many lives as she can and to see each child live in purpose, equality, and pure happiness starting with the children of Trinidad and Tobago.

Miss Oneness Trinidad and Tobago 2015
On Saturday July 25, Kimberly Farrah Singh was crowned Miss T&T 2015.

References

Living people
Trinidad and Tobago beauty pageant winners
1993 births
Miss World 2015 delegates